Micropleurotoma is a genus of sea snails, marine gastropod mollusks in the family Horaiclavidae

Species
Species within the genus Micropleurotoma include:
 Micropleurotoma melvilli (Sykes, 1906)
 Micropleurotoma remota (Powell, 1958)
 Micropleurotoma spirotropoides (Thiele, 1925)
 Micropleurotoma travailleuri Bouchet & Warén, 1980

References

External links
  Tucker, J.K. 2004 Catalog of recent and fossil turrids (Mollusca: Gastropoda). Zootaxa 682:1-1295.
  Kantor Y.I., Harasewych M.G. & Puillandre N. (2016). A critical review of Antarctic Conoidea (Neogastropoda). Molluscan Research. DOI: 10.1080/13235818.2015.1128523

 
Horaiclavidae
Gastropod genera